Daniel Kirkwood "Kirk" Fordice Jr. (February 10, 1934 – September 7, 2004), was an American politician and businessman who served as the 61st Governor of Mississippi from 1992 to 2000.  He was the first Republican governor of the state since Reconstruction-era governor Adelbert Ames, who served from 1874 to 1876, and the first governor elected to two consecutive four-year terms (following a 1987 amendment to the state constitution). Fordice was a staunch conservative, running on a pro-business, anti-crime, low-tax, family values platform.

A successful businessman, Fordice took over his father's construction company and became a millionaire. He ran for governor in 1991 as a Republican, championing various conservative causes.

Early life 
Daniel Kirkwood "Kirk" Fordice Jr. was born in Memphis, Tennessee, United States on February 10, 1934. Fordice studied civil engineering at Purdue University, earning a bachelor's degree and a master's in 1956 and 1957, respectively. After graduation he served with the United States Army for two years. He remained in the Army Reserve until 1977, retiring with the rank of colonel.

Fordice eventually took control of his father's firm, Fordice Construction Company. In the 1960s he created a building division for the company, focusing on industrial structures, and in the 1980 he created a bridge division. Fordice's reliance on federal government contracts led him to involve himself in several construction trade groups. In 1974 he joined the executive committee of the Associated General Contractors of America. Holding various leadership positions in the group form 1988 to 1991 (serving the last two years as its president), he acted as a strong proponent of the construction industry and testified several times before U.S. congressional committees. He led the organization through several involved lawsuits aimed at ending minority and small business set-aside requirements for contracting, including City of Richmond v. J.A. Croson Co.. His activity in the trade groups increased his interest in politics.

Political career 

Fordice joined the Republican Party during Barry Goldwater's 1964 presidential campaign. He chaired the Warren County organizations for Gil Carmichael's gubernatorial campaigns in the 1970s. In 1982 he was elected secretary of the Mississippi Republican Party and convinced the  Associated General Contractors to publicly support Republican Haley Barbour in that year's United States Senate election in Mississippi.

In 1991 State Auditor Pete Johnson, a former Democrat, entered the 1991 Republican gubernatorial primary. He was challenged by Fordice and another candidate. While Johnson was treated as the frontrunner for much of the campaign, Fordice gradually built a skilled political organization. He characterized Johnson as a "professional politician". Fordice led in the first primary and defeated Johnson in an October runoff, taking 31,753 votes to Johnson's 20,622 votes. While he approached Republican leaders who had embraced Johnson early on with some suspicion, the party rallied around him for the general election. 

In the general election Fordice faced Democratic incumbent Ray Mabus. Fordice declared his support for legislative term limits and welfare reform. He labeled Mabus a "Kennedyesque liberal" who focused too much on education and criticized his deficit spending. Republican-hosted focus groups found the governor to be "aloof" and unconcerned with the necessities of "average" Mississippians. Mabus continued to advocate support for public education and attack Fordice as a lobbyist and outside who did not appreciate the needs of the state. Later in the campaign, race became an issue, as Fordice declared his support for workfare and ending racial quotas. Mabus aired a series of television ads which accused Fordice of planning to shut down the state's historically black schools.

The governor spent twice as much as his opponent and held an edge in polls up to the election, but many potential voters identified themselves as undecided. On November 5, Fordice won with 50.8 percent to Mabus' 47.6 percent, the first Republican victory in a Mississippi gubernatorial race since 1874. Having received six percent less of the total vote share than in 1987, several observers blamed Mabus' loss on perception that he was an arrogant leader. Turnout among black voters was also lower in 1991, and some national Democrats accused Fordice of using race-baiting tactics. He was inaugurated as governor on January 14, 1992. 

He vetoed the Education Enhancement Act of 1992, arguing that it was tantamount to a tax increase, but the legislature overrode his veto.

Fordice was re-elected in 1995 against Democratic Mississippi Secretary of State Dick Molpus. His second inauguration was on January 16, 1996. An outspoken conservative, Fordice advocated tax cuts, the abolishment of affirmative action, reductions in the welfare system, expanded capital punishment, tougher prison conditions and the building of more prisons. He was injured in a car wreck on November 5, and Lieutenant Governor Ronnie Musgrove served as acting governor from November 7 to December 17 while Fordice recovered in a hospital.

Fordice offended Jewish groups such as B'nai B'rith by referring to America as "a Christian Nation" during a Republican governors conference. South Carolina governor Carroll Campbell quickly offered a correction, adding "Judeo-" as a prefix to Christian, but Fordice snapped back that he meant what he said. He later apologized for any offense. Fordice refused to discuss any increase in public school pay rates across the state, even though Mississippi ranked 49th in the nation. When teachers discussed striking he ordered that any teacher who went on strike be immediately fired.

In August 1996, Fordice signed an executive order banning recognition of same-sex marriages in Mississippi. Lawmakers said then that they would back up the executive order with a law. In 2004, Mississippi voters passed a constitutional amendment defining marriage as only between a man and a woman and further banning recognition of same-sex marriages from other states and countries. Both acts were declared unconstitutional by the 2015 Obergefell v. Hodges decision from the Supreme Court of the United States.

Fordice said he would have quit his position of Governor while still in office, except that he did not want to give the Democratic candidate, Musgrove, any spot-light time of running the state before the actual election. He left office on January 11, 2000.

Personal life

Extramarital affair
Fordice's tenure was roiled by an extramarital affair with his high school sweetheart Ann G. Creson, which led to his divorce from his wife of forty-four years, Pat Fordice. After leaving office, Fordice married Ann, but they later divorced.

Fordice received much scorn when he suddenly announced that he had "irreconcilable differences" with his wife in 1993; she claimed that she had no intention of getting a divorce, and they remained together. Additionally, in 1996, he was photographed eating lunch with a middle-aged woman. These two scandals were soon overshadowed by Fordice's other actions, and he came to national attention for supporting the impeachment of then-president Bill Clinton on moral grounds. In June 1999, the media reported Fordice's long-running extramarital affair with his high school sweetheart, Ann Creson, who had recently been widowed; they were photographed returning from a vacation together, and journalists reported that Fordice and Creson kissed and massaged each other's shoulders. Outside the governor's private home in Madison, Fordice responded to WLBT reporter Bert Case asking questions in his news car by threatening to "whip your ass".

Later that year, he announced that he was divorcing his wife of 44 years and the mother of his four children. In the divorce petition, Fordice claimed that he and his wife had been estranged for three years, even though they both lived in the Governor's mansion, and that he planned to marry Creson as soon as the divorce was finalized. Pat Fordice condemned her husband's actions, issuing a formal statement reading "it is not fair for Governor Fordice to call upon her to calm the storms by making or adopting public announcements which run contrary to her true feelings ... [Pat Fordice] apologizes to the people of this state for being a partner in a marriage that has become a source of embarrassment for Mississippi."

Just days after the divorce was finalized in early 2000, Fordice married Creson; they divorced in 2003. Fordice died in 2004, surrounded by his children and former wife; the two are interred beside each other with their own individual grave markers.

Retirement years and death
After retiring, Fordice settled in Madison, Mississippi. He died from leukemia in Jackson on September 7, 2004, at age 70. Kirk and Pat Fordice, who reconciled shortly before his death, are interred with a double marker at Parkway Memorial Cemetery in Ridgeland.

References

Sources
 
 
 Edsall, Thomas B. "Miss. Governor Ending Historic Tenure", The Washington Post, February 27, 1999; pg. L1

External links
 
 

1934 births
2004 deaths
20th-century American businesspeople
20th-century American politicians
American construction businesspeople
Methodists from Mississippi
Burials in Mississippi
Businesspeople from Mississippi
Christians from Mississippi
Deaths from cancer in Mississippi
Deaths from leukemia
Republican Party governors of Mississippi
People from Madison, Mississippi
Politicians from Memphis, Tennessee
Politicians from Vicksburg, Mississippi
Purdue University alumni
United States Army officers